George Feigenbaum (July 2, 1929 – December 25, 2000) was an American professional basketball player. He was a point guard who played two seasons in the National Basketball Association (NBA) as a member of the Baltimore Bullets and the Milwaukee Hawks.

Feigenbaum was born in Binghamton, New York, on July 2, 1929, and was raised in Brooklyn. He graduated from New Utrecht High School where he was named first team All-PSAL and led the league in scoring his senior season. He was recruited to the University of Kentucky basketball team where he played under coach Adolph Rupp. Feigenbaum's college career finished at Long Island University.

Besides his two seasons in the NBA, Feigenbaum also played in the Eastern Professional Basketball League (EPBL) and the American Basketball League (ABA). He was selected to the All-EPBL Second Team while playing for the Williamsport Billies in 1954.

After retiring from professional basketball he started a plumbing company in New York City. He died on December 25, 2000, and was survived by his wife, Francine Feigenbaum, and three children.

NBA career statistics

Regular season

References

External links

1929 births
2000 deaths
American Basketball League (1925–1955) players
American plumbers
Baltimore Bullets (1944–1954) players
Basketball players from New York (state)
Kentucky Wildcats men's basketball players
LIU Brooklyn Blackbirds men's basketball players
Milwaukee Hawks players
Sportspeople from Binghamton, New York
Philadelphia Sphas players
Undrafted National Basketball Association players
American men's basketball players
Point guards
20th-century American Jews